Lucia Giamberardino (born 6 March 1990) is a team handball player from Argentina. She defends Argentina, such as at the 2011 World Women's Handball Championship in Brazil.

References

1990 births
Living people
Argentine female handball players
21st-century Argentine women